The Kolkata–Radhikapur Express is an Express train belonging to Eastern Railway zone that runs between Kolkata (KOAA) and Radhikapur (RDP) in India. It is currently being operated with 13145/13146 train numbers on a daily basis.

Service

13145/Kolkata–Radhikapur Express: The 13145 Up has an average speed of 42 km/hr and covers 480 km in 11h 20m. It departs from Kolkata at 19:30 and arrives at Radhikapur at 6:50 after completing 20 halts.

It departs from Radhikapur at 17:50 and arrives at Kolkata at 5:35 after completing 20 halts.

Route and halts 

The important halts of the train are:

 
 
 
 
 
 
 
 
 
 
 
 
 
 
 Kaliaganj

Coach composition

The train has standard ICF rakes with maximum speed of 110 km/h. The train consists of 20 coaches:

 2 AC II Tier cum AC III Tier
 2 AC III Tier
 7 Sleeper coaches
 7 General
 2 Seating cum Luggage Rake

Traction

Both trains are hauled by a -based WAP 4 locomotive from Kolkata to Azimganj Jn. Then A diesel Loco from Azimganj to Radhikapur and vice versa.

See also 

 Kolkata railway station
 Radhikapur railway station
 Seemanchal Link Express
 Radhikapur–Siliguri DEMU

References

External links 

 13145/Kolkata–Radhikapur Express
 13146/Radhikapur–Kolkata Express

Transport in Kolkata
Express trains in India
Rail transport in West Bengal